Dalmatia Creek is a tributary of the Susquehanna River in Northumberland County, Pennsylvania, in the United States. The creek has no named tributaries, but several unnamed ones. Both it and its tributaries are designated as impaired waterbodies due to sedimentation/siltation from crop-related agriculture and vegetation removal. Streambank erosion also occurs in the watershed. The creek is in the Ridge and Valley physiographic province.

The main land use in the watershed of Dalmatia Creek is agricultural land, but forested land, low-intensity development, and transitional land are also present. The creek experienced flooding during Tropical Storm Agnes in 1972. A bridge carrying Pennsylvania Route 147 has been constructed across it in Dalmatia. The drainage basin of the creek is designated as a Warmwater Fishery and a Migratory Fishery.

Course

Dalmatia Creek begins at the base of a mountain in Lower Mahanoy Township. It flows north-northwest for a few tenths of a mile, entering a valley. The creek then flows west-southwest for a few tenths of a mile, receiving an unnamed tributary from the left before turning west. After several tenths of a mile, it turns west-southwest again for several tenths of a mile, receiving two more unnamed tributaries from the left, one of them extremely short. The creek then turns west for a few tenths of a mile, receiving another two unnamed tributaries from the left, before turning west-southwest. After several tenths of a mile, it turns west for a few tenths of a mile, receiving two more unnamed tributaries from the left and entering the census-designated place of Dalmatia. Here, the creek turns northwest for a few tenths of a mile before turning west. A short distance further downstream, it crosses Pennsylvania Route 147 and reaches its confluence with the Susquehanna River.

Tributaries
Dalmatia Creek has no named tributaries. However, it does have seven unnamed tributaries. They are known as Unt 17500, Unt 17501, Unt 17502, Unt 17503, Unt 17504, Unt 17505, and Unt 17506. All of these streams are designated as impaired waterbodies for the same reasons as the main stem. Some tributaries suffer from little riparian buffering, or even none at all, and at least one has been plowed over. However, a tributary in the creek's upper reaches has some riparian buffering, reduced erosion, and relatively stable streambanks.

Hydrology and climate
Dalmatia Creek is designated as an impaired waterbody. The cause of impairment is sedimentation/siltation and the probable sources of impairment are crop-related agriculture and removal of vegetation.

The peak annual discharge at the mouth of Dalmatia Creek has a 10 percent chance of reaching . It has a 2 percent chance of reaching  and a 1 percent chance of reaching . The peak annual discharge has a 0.2 percent chance of reaching . Some reaches of the creek are intermittent.

Pastures have the highest unit area load, while forests have the lowest.

Geography and geology
The southern edge of the watershed is on Fisher Ridge.

Dalmatia Creek has been described as "a minute stream" and "barely a trickle" in A. Joseph Armstrong's 2000 book Trout Unlimited's Guide to Pennsylvania Limestone Streams.

Dalmatia Creek is in the Ridge and Valley physiographic province. The slopes in the watershed generally have a low gradient. This, combined with the lack of vegetation in agricultural areas, causes excessive runoff during precipitation events. Unprotected stream banks in the watershed lead to stream bank erosion and slumping. The banks are also undercut and/or deteriorated in some reaches; they are described as "deteriating and slumping" at the headwaters. There are also excessive sediment deposits in the creek.

The dominant hydrologic soil group in the watershed of Dalmatia Creek is B. The dominant surface geology is schist, a metamorphic rock, which underlies the entire watershed. The surface geology has little influence on the sediment loads in the creek. The natural fluvial geomorphology is channelized in some reaches. cobbles of chert of varying sizes have been observed on the eastern bank of the Susquehanna River, not far from the creek.

Watershed
The mouth of the creek is in the United States Geological Survey quadrangle of Dalmatia. However, its source is in the quadrangle of Pillow. The creek's mouth is located at Dalmatia. The settlement of Hickory Corners is also in the watershed.

Dalmatia Creek is entirely within Lower Mahanoy Township, as are all of its tributaries.

The dominant land use in the watershed of Dalmatia Creek is agricultural land, including cropland and hay/pastures; agricultural land occupies 56.9 percent of the watershed. Forested land makes up 34.0 percent of the watershed. Low-intensity development accounts for 8.7 percent of the watershed's area, while transitional land accounts for 0.2 percent. Tillage is done in the creek's agricultural areas, even in some intermittent reaches of the creek itself. The agricultural land includes slightly more hay and pastures than cropland,  versus .

Dalmatia Creek, along with numerous other streams in the area, experienced flooding during Tropical Storm Agnes in June 1972. Sometime after Tropical Storm Agnes, stream restoration was considered and/or carried out on Dalmatia Creek, in addition to reseeding  of stream banks in an effort to reduce erosion and siltation.

History

Dalmatia Creek was entered into the Geographic Names Information System on August 2, 1979. Its identifier in the Geographic Names Information System is 1172900.

In July 2012, the Lower Mahanoy Township Municipal Authority received a Water Obstructions and Encroachments permit to built, maintain, and operate an elevated platform for the control panel of the Dalmatia Creek grinder Pump Station near Dalmatia Creek itself. In August 2012, the Pennsylvania Department of Environmental Protection invited comments on its proposed Total Maximum Daily Load plan for Dalmatia Creek. However, no public comments were received.

Biology
The drainage basin of Dalmatia Creek is designated as a Warmwater Fishery and a Migratory Fishery. The creek's designated use is aquatic life. This regulation forbade any attempt to target or catch bass between May 1 and June 17, with immediate catch and release being in effect for bass the rest of the year. However, the creek is not a trout fishery.

The riparian buffers of Dalmatia Creek are limited or nonexistent in agricultural areas. Cropland mowing occurs right up to the creek's banks in some areas. Additionally, livestock have access to the creek, and barn waste is flushed into the headwaters.

See also
Hoffer Creek, next tributary of the Susquehanna River going downriver
Independence Run, next tributary of the Susquehanna River going upriver
List of rivers of Pennsylvania

References

Rivers of Northumberland County, Pennsylvania
Tributaries of the Susquehanna River
Rivers of Pennsylvania